The S2 7.0 is an American trailerable sailboat that was designed by Arthur Edmunds as a cruiser and first built in 1975. The designation indicates the approximate length overall in meters.

The hull molds for the S2 7.0 were later used for the Sovereign 23 and Sovereign 24 sailboats.

Production
The design was built by S2 Yachts in Holland, Michigan, United States from 1975 until 1977, with 140 boats completed, but it is now out of production.

Design
The S2 7.0 is a recreational keelboat, built predominantly of fiberglass, with wood trim. It has a masthead sloop rig, a raked stem, a slightly angled transom, a transom-hung rudder controlled by a tiller and a fixed stub keel, with a  retractable centerboard. It displaces  and carries  of ballast.

The boat is normally fitted with a small  outboard motor for docking and maneuvering.

The design has sleeping accommodation for four people, with a double "V"-berth in the bow cabin and two a straight settee berths in the main cabin. The galley is located on the starboard side at the companionway ladder. The galley is equipped with an ice box and a sink. The enclosed head is located at the companionway on the port side.

Operational history
In a 2010 review Steve Henkel wrote, "Arthur Edmunds had his own design office for over 30 years, wrote the book Designing Power and Sail in 1998, and designed boats for Chris Craft and for Allied Boat Company (notably the Allied Princess 36 and Mistress 38). He fashioned this little vessel for S2 Yachts in 1975. She is a keel-centerboarder ... she is on the heavy side for a sailboat only 22 feet on deck ... Best features: Headroom at 5' 0" is quite good for a 22-footer ... She is definitely a cruiser, not a racer, so her PHRF of 261, while high, will not be of concern to most potential owners. Worst features: Her accommodation design and domed cabin may not appeal to everybody. That may be why her builders left her on the market for only three years."

See also
List of sailing boat types

References

Keelboats
1970s sailboat type designs
Sailing yachts
Trailer sailers
Sailboat type designs by Arthur Edmunds
Sailboat types built by S2 Yachts